Luhden is a municipality in the district of Schaumburg, in Lower Saxony, Germany.

The first attested reference to Luhden (appearing as Ludhen) is in the records of Obernkirchen Abbey dated 1281.

References

Municipalities in Lower Saxony
Schaumburg
Principality of Schaumburg-Lippe